The 2016 Rallye Deutschland (formally the 34. ADAC Rallye Deutschland) was the ninth round of the 2016 World Rally Championship. The race was held over three days between 19 August and 21 August 2016, and was based in Trier, Germany. Volkswagen's Sébastien Ogier won the race, his 35th win in the World Rally Championship.

Entry list

Overall standings

Special stages

Power Stage
The "Power stage" was a  stage at the end of the rally.

References

Deutschland
Rallye Deutschland
Rally